John Georg Peterson (20 February 1883 – 23 November 1964) was a Swedish long-distance runner. He competed in the men's 5 miles at the 1908 Summer Olympics.

References

1883 births
1964 deaths
Athletes (track and field) at the 1908 Summer Olympics
Swedish male long-distance runners
Olympic athletes of Sweden
Place of birth missing